Som Sereyvuth is a Cambodian judge and member of the Khmer Rouge Tribunal. He was appointed a judge of the Supreme Court of Cambodia in 1988.

References

External links

Living people
Year of birth missing (living people)
Cambodian judges
Khmer Rouge Tribunal judges
Place of birth missing (living people)